The Young Women's Leadership School (TYWLS) are public secondary schools for grades 6–12 that are operated by Student Leadership Network. TYWLS provide a single-gender educational choice for students who are often the first in their families to attend college. 

Two of the five schools in the Student Leadership Network (formerly Young Women's Leadership Network)
 Young Women's Leadership School of East Harlem
 The Young Women's Leadership School of Queens, Queens, New York City

Affiliate schools of the Young Women's Leadership Network:
 Ann Richards School for Young Women Leaders, Austin, Texas
 Baltimore Leadership School for Young Women, Maryland
 Irma Lerma Rangel Young Women's Leadership School, Dallas, Texas
 Young Women's College Preparatory Academy, Houston, Texas
 Young Women's Leadership Charter School of Chicago, Chicago, Illinois
 The Young Women's Leadership School at Rhodes High School, Philadelphia, Pennsylvania
Young Woman's Leadership Academy,  Midland, TX

Other schools
 Coretta Scott King Young Women's Leadership Academy, Atlanta, Georgia

See also 
 Young Women's Leadership Academy (disambiguation)